WVNZ is an oldies formatted broadcast radio station licensed to Richmond, Virginia, serving Metro Richmond. WVNZ is owned and operated by Michael Mazursky, through licensee Mobile Radio Partners, Inc.

Sale
On July 14, 2015, Davidson Media Group announced it would be selling WTOX and sister station WVNZ to TBLC Virginia Holdings, LLC. for $400,000. The sale was consummated on November 5, 2015.

In late 2018, Mobile Radio Partners took over programming control, and put its Boomtown Richmond format, already heard on WBTL, on WVNZ. Effective June 9, 2021, Mobile Radio Partners acquired WVNZ, WTOX, and a translator from TBLC Media for $209,500.

References

External links

Boomtown Richmond Facebook

VNZ
Radio stations established in 1945
1945 establishments in Virginia
Oldies radio stations in the United States